Richard Lucas Estens  (born 1949 in Gilgandra, New South Wales) is an Australian cotton farmer and businessman.

Early life
Estens was born in Gilgandra and was brought up on a property close to the town. He was educated at All Saints College in Bathurst. After leaving school early he became an aircraft pilot.

Cotton farming
In 1981, Estens started farming cotton on a property near Moree.

Public life

Aboriginal Employment Strategy
In 1997, with the support of the Gwydir Valley Cotton Growers Association, Estens established the Aboriginal Employment Strategy with the goal of providing support for Aboriginal people in Moree who were looking to enter the job market. One of the motivations behind the establishment of the AES was a recommendation from the 1991 Royal Commission into Aboriginal Deaths in Custody that employment promotion committees be established across the country.

Estens Report
The Howard Government commissioned Estens to head the "Regional Telecommunications Inquiry" into the proposed sale of Telstra. In late 2002 he delivered what became known as the Estens Report to the government.

Recognition
In 2004 Estens was awarded the Human Rights Medal by the Human Rights and Equal Opportunity Commission.

Estens was made an Officer of the Order of Australia in June 2009.

References

Australian farmers
People from New South Wales
1949 births
Australian aviators
Officers of the Order of Australia
Living people